Vyazovoye is a rural locality (a selo) and the administrative center of Vyazovskoye rural settlement, Krasnoyaruzhsky District, Belgorod Oblast, Russia. The population was 934 as of 2010. There are 13 streets.

Geography 
Vyazovoye is located 15 km west of Krasnaya Yaruga (the district's administrative centre) by road. Kolotilovka is the nearest rural locality.

References 

Rural localities in Krasnoyaruzhsky District
Grayvoronsky Uyezd